Salsify may refer to:
 Tragopogon, a plant genus
 Tragopogon porrifolius, a plant with linear leaves cultivated for its light-skinned edible root and herbal properties
 Scorzonera hispanica, a plant with lanceolate leaves cultivated for its dark-skinned edible root